Luis Alberto Baeza Mena (born 6 December 1938) is a Mexican former football forward who played for Mexico in the 1962 FIFA World Cup. He also played for Club Necaxa. He played one season in the North American Soccer League for the San Diego Toros.

References

External links

1938 births
Mexican expatriate footballers
Mexico international footballers
Association football forwards
Footballers from Mexico City
Club Necaxa footballers
San Diego Toros players
Liga MX players
North American Soccer League (1968–1984) players
1962 FIFA World Cup players
Expatriate soccer players in the United States
Mexican expatriate sportspeople in the United States
Living people
Mexican footballers